"Hit and Run" is a song by American electronic music group Breathe Carolina. It was released on May 22, 2012 as the second single from the reloaded version of their third studio album Hell Is What You Make It.

Background and composition
The song was written by David Schmitt, Kyle Even, Eric Armenta, Joshua Aragon, Luis Bonet, and Lindy Robbins while production was handled by Ian Kirkpatrick and Matt Squire. The track runs at 124 BPM and is in the key of F-sharp minor. Band member Kyle Even said that the song was one of his favorites from the album. Even said that the song is about, "wanting things to stay the same, but wanting them to be different, too."

The band released the cover art for "Hit and Run" on May 16, 2012. They first performed the song live on May 19, 2012. The song premiered on Alternative Press on May 21, 2012 and was released digitally the following day. A lyric video was released that same day. A remix to the song was released in July 2012 that was included in the reloaded version of Hell Is What You Make It. The song sold 20,000 digital downloads in its first week.

Reception
MTV's David Greenwald said, "'Hit and Run' goes all T-Pain-meets-Skrillex on us, smoothing out the duo's vocals with auto-tune and adding rave-ready bass to Breathe Carolina's beat arsenal."

Music video
The band released a music video teaser for "Hit and Run" on June 8. It was officially released on June 13, 2012 and was directed by Travis Kopach. Speaking about the music video, Kyle Even said, "The whole idea behind the video was that we live in this black and white world, but there was one girl who knew what color was and she shows us that it's ok to be different. It starts a contagious array and now the whole world is in color."

Track listing
Digital download

CD single

Remix version

Charts

Release history

References

External links

2012 singles
2012 songs
Fearless Records singles
Breathe Carolina songs